Mullia wali (Also named as Moolian Wali or Mullian Wali) is a village in the city of Fazika in Firozpur district in the state of Punjab, India.

The village is located on the road Malout to Fazilka and is about 23 km from Fazilka.

People 

The population of Mullia Wali is 2196 according to 2001 census.

References 

www.pbplanning.gov.in/pdf/ferozpur.pdf

Villages in Firozpur district